Xerocrassa moraguesi is a species of air-breathing land snail, a pulmonate gastropod mollusk in the family Geomitridae, the hairy snails and their allies.

Distribution

This species is endemic to Spain, where it is restricted to the northern part of the Balearic island of Mallorca.

References

 Bank, R. A.; Neubert, E. (2017). Checklist of the land and freshwater Gastropoda of Europe. Last update: July 16th, 2017

External links

moraguesi
Molluscs of Europe
Endemic fauna of the Balearic Islands
Gastropods described in 1883